Brian John Coyle (June 25, 1944 – August 23, 1991) was an American community leader, elected official, and gay activist. Coyle was one of the founders of the alternative newspaper Hundred Flowers.

Biography
Brian John Coyle was born on June 25, 1944 in Great Falls, Montana. He was raised in Moorhead, Minnesota and graduated from Moorhead High School. He received his BA degree from the University of Minnesota (Minneapolis campus) in 1967. While at the University, Coyle was a member of Students for a Democratic Society and a writer for the Minnesota Daily. He organized the first Vietnam 'teach-in' at the University, and originated the Free University.

After graduating from the University, Coyle taught humanities at Moorhead State University for one year, where he was indicted for failure to register for the draft, but was acquitted as a conscientious objector. He returned to Minneapolis in 1968, worked at the Twin Cities Draft Information Center, and was one of the founders of the alternative newspaper Hundred Flowers. He worked as national office coordinator for the New American Movement and directed the National Campaign to Impeach Nixon, and founded the Progressive Roundtable. During this time (1971), he publicly came out as gay.

1970s and later 
Locally, Coyle spent much time in the mid-to-late-1970s working on tenants' rights issues, and campaigning (unsuccessfully) for a rent control ordinance. He was also active in powerline protests in rural Minnesota (along with future Minnesota Senator Paul Wellstone). From 1979-1981, Coyle organized with Minnesotans Against the Downtown Dome (MADD), a coalition opposed to the construction of a subsidized sports stadium in downtown Minneapolis.

In 1978, Coyle ran as an independent candidate for US Senator, in a special election to complete the term of Hubert Humphrey (losing to David Durenberger). In 1979, he ran for Mayor of Minneapolis (losing to DFL'er Don Fraser). He ran for the Minneapolis City Council (Ward 6) in 1981, but lost to incumbent Jackie Slater in a close race. In 1983, he won election to the City Council, where he concentrated on affordable housing, human rights, economic development, the environment and transportation. Coyle also fought for light rail transportation and domestic partner benefits. He served as council vice president. He was one of 13 openly gay elected officials at the International Network of Lesbian and Gay Officials (INLGO) Conference in 1985.

Coyle served three terms on the City Council. He was diagnosed as HIV-positive in 1986, but this was not known publicly until 1991, the same year that he died from AIDS-related complications, aged 47. Ford House is a memorial to Coyle. A Minneapolis community center, a neighborhood garden and a Human Rights Campaign leadership award also carry his name. On October 13, 1996, a commissioned bust of Coyle, created by artist Deborah Richert, was unveiled in the rotunda of Minneapolis' City Hall.

Notes

External links
 Brian Coyle Community Center in Cedar-Riverside, Minneapolis
 Brian Coyle Community Garden in Elliot Park, Minneapolis
 

1944 births
1991 deaths
20th-century American politicians
AIDS-related deaths in Minnesota
American conscientious objectors
American human rights activists
Anti–Vietnam War activists
Gay politicians
American LGBT city council members
American LGBT rights activists
LGBT people from Montana
LGBT people from Minnesota
Minneapolis City Council members
Minnesota State University Moorhead faculty
Politicians from Great Falls, Montana
Politicians from Minneapolis
University of Minnesota alumni